Ramzi or Ramzy is a masculine given name and surname of Arabic origin. It may refer to:

Given name
Ramzi
 Ramzi Abed (born 1973), American film director, founder of "Bloodshot Pictures" and founding member of the electronic group, Elektracity
 Ramzi Abid (born 1980), Canadian ice hockey player
 Ramzi Aouad, Australian triple murderer
 Ramzi Attaie, Iranian admiral
 Ramzi Aya (born 1990) Italian footballer
 Ramzi Boukhiam (born 1993), Moroccan surfer
 Ramzi Bourakba (born 1984), Algerian footballer
 Ramzi Chouchar (born 1997), Algerian swimmer
 Ramzi Irani (1966–2002), Lebanese Forces student representative
 Ramzi Mohammed (born 1981), Somali terrorist
 Ramzi Rahaman (born 1954), Sri Lankan fashion designer and hairdresser
 Ramzi Saleh (born 1980), Palestinian footballer
 Ramzi Ben Sliman (born 1982), French film director and screenwriter
 Ramzi bin al-Shibh (born 1972), Yemeni held in Guantanamo
 Kamal Ramzi Stino (born 1910), Egyptian Deputy Prime Minister
 Ramzi Yassa, Egyptian pianist
 Ramzi Ben Younès (born 1978), Tunisian footballer
 Ramzi Yousef (born 1967), Kuwaiti terrorist
Ramzy
 Ramzy Al Duhami (born 1972), Saudi Arabian show jumping rider
 Ramzy Bedia (born 1972), Algerian-French actor

Surname
Ramzi
 Adil Ramzi (born 1977), Moroccan footballer
 Omar 'The White Sudani' Ramzi (born 1983), Sudanese stand-up comedian
 Rashid Ramzi  (born 1980), Moroccan athlete
 Soheir Ramzi (born 1950), Egyptian actress

Ramzy
 Ahmed Ramzy (born 1930), Egyptian actor
 Ahmed Ramzy (footballer) (born 1965), Egyptian footballer
 Bashir Ramzy (born 1979), American long jumper
 Hany Ramzy (born 1969), Egyptian footballer
 Hossam Ramzy, Egyptian percussionist and composer
 Ramzy Ezzeldin Ramzy (born 1954), Egyptian politician and diplomat

See also
 Remzi (disambiguation), Turkish variant of the name Ramzi
 Ramsay (surname)
 Ramsey (surname)

Arabic-language surnames
Arabic masculine given names